The Passage is a novel series by Justin Cronin. There are three published books in the series. The film rights were acquired by Fox Entertainment Group in 2007 for adaptation into a film trilogy, but after 12 years of development and planning, it was changed to a television series, which premiered in January 2019 and was canceled after the first season.

The Passage

The Passage was published in 2010 by Ballantine Books, a division of Random House, Inc., New York.  The Passage debuted at #3 on the New York Times hardcover fiction best seller list, and remained on the list 7 additional weeks.  It is the first novel of the trilogy.

The Twelve

The Twelve is a 2012 horror novel by Justin Cronin and is the second novel in the trilogy. The novel was published on October 16, 2012 by Ballantine Books.

The City of Mirrors

The City of Mirrors was released in the United States on May 24. 2016.

References

External links

 "Enter The Passage", The official website
 "Find Subject Zero" , An official companion website
 The UK edition of The Passage 
 "Apocalypse Wow", National Post article with details on movie rights for The Passage
 "Literary Novelist Turns to Vampires and Finds Pot of Gold", New York Times, Julie Bosman, June 1, 2010
 "A Journal of the Plague Century: Civilization Goes Viral. Stuff Ensues.", New York Times, Janet Maslin, June 6, 2010
 

2010s horror novels
2010s science fiction novels
American novel series
American fantasy novel series
American post-apocalyptic novels
American vampire novels
Dystopian novels
Fantasy novel trilogies
Horror novel series
Science fiction novel trilogies
Thriller novel series
Ballantine Books books